Culaba (IPA: [kʊ'labɐʔ]), officially the Municipality of Culaba, is a 5th class municipality in the province of Biliran, Philippines. According to the 2020 census, it has a population of 12,972 people.The town's populace predominantly speak Waray language.

Geography
According to the Philippine Statistics Authority, the municipality has a land area of  constituting  of the  total area of Biliran.

Barangays
Culaba is politically subdivided into 17 barangays.

Climate

Demographics

In the 2020 census, Culaba had a population of 12,972.

Economy

Education

Secondary schools
 Culaba National Vocational School
 Bool National High School
 Pinamihagan Integrated High School

Elementary schools

 Acaban Elementary School
 Bacolod Elementary School
 Binongtoan Elementary School
 Bool Elementary School
 Culaba Central School
 Calipayan Elementary School
 Habuhab Elementary School
 Looc Elementary School
 Patag Elementary School
 Pinamihagan Elementary School
 Salvation Elementary School
 San Roque Elementary School

Healthcare
 Culaba Community Hospital
 Bool Health Center
 Bacolod Health Center
 Pinamihagan Health Center

References

External links
 [ Philippine Standard Geographic Code]

Municipalities of Biliran